is a Japanese real estate developer.

History

Mori Trust was founded in 1970 as Mori Building Development, a subsidiary of the Mori Building group founded by Taikichiro Mori. Following his death in 1993, his two sons Minoru Mori and Akira Mori disagreed as to how to continue the business, with Minoru wishing to continue the company's focus on existing properties and new large-scale urban projects, and Akira wishing to expand the company's portfolio into more small-scale office and leisure properties. This led to a split of the Mori Building group, with Akira Mori taking over the Mori Building Development entity and renaming it "Mori Trust" in 1999. Mori Trust properties that predated the 1999 schism were originally named "Hills" or "Mori Building" but were renamed to "Trust Tower" or "MT Building" around 2002. Mori Building, which spent years planning and completing the Roppongi Hills complex in central Tokyo, focuses on multibillion-dollar complexes; Mori Trust sticks to single or twin structures.

Mori Trust announced in December 2015 that it would begin investing in the United States, starting with the $658 million acquisition of two office buildings in Boston from Liberty Mutual. The company was also reportedly examining potential investments in New York, Washington and other East Coast cities, with a total budget of 100 to 200 billion yen.

Akira Mori has selected his only daughter Miwako Date, who served as president of Mori Trust Hotels & Resorts, to take over the Mori Trust business, which she did in 2016. Akira Mori is now assuming the role of Chairman of the Board of Mori Trust.

Major office properties

 Tokyo
 Tokyo Shiodome Building
 Marunouchi Trust City
 Akasaka Twin Tower
 Gotenyama Garden
 Shiroyama Trust Tower

 Sendai
 Sendai Trust Tower

Major hotel properties

 Laforet Hotels chain
 Rihga Royal Hotels chain (minority partner)
 Conrad Tokyo
 Courtyard by Marriott Tokyo Station
 Westin Sendai
 InterContinental Yokohama Grand
 Shangri-La Tokyo
 Sunroute Plaza Shinjuku
 Iraph Sui
 Suiran

References

External links

Mori Trust website

Real estate companies based in Tokyo